The United Kingdom of Great Britain and Northern Ireland (often referred to as Great Britain) competed at the 2013 World Championships in Athletics from August 10 to August 18 in Moscow, Russia.
A team of 60 athletes was announced to represent the country at the event. The team finished with three gold medals and three bronze.

Medallists
The following British competitors won medals at the Championships

Results

(q – qualified, NM – no mark, SB – season best)

Men

Track events

Field events

Decathlon

Women

Track events

Field events

References

Nations at the 2013 World Championships in Athletics
2013 in British sport
Athletics in the United Kingdom
Great Britain and Northern Ireland at the World Championships in Athletics
2013 in Northern Ireland sport
Athletics in Northern Ireland